Perimyotini is a tribe of bats in the family Vespertilionidae. It contains two species of bats found in North America, each in their own monotypic genus.

Although this name is already in use by taxonomic authorities, such as the Handbook of the Mammals of the World, ITIS and the American Society of Mammalogists, and was first suggested as a name in a 2009 study, it has not actually been formally described.

Species 
There are two genera in the tribe, each with one species:

 Genus Parastrellus
 Canyon bat, Parastrellus hesperus
 Genus Perimyotis
 Tricolored bat, Perimyotis subflavus

References 

Mammal tribes
Vesper bats
Nomina nuda